Burntside is an unincorporated community in Morse Township, Saint Louis County, Minnesota, United States.

The community is located three miles west of Ely, near the junction of State Highway 169 (MN 169) / State Highway 1 (MN 1), and Saint Louis County Road 88 (Grant–McMahan Boulevard).

Burntside Lake and Shagawa Lake are in the vicinity.

References

Unincorporated communities in Minnesota
Unincorporated communities in St. Louis County, Minnesota